David Wilber (October 5, 1820 – April 1, 1890) was a United States representative from New York.

Early life 
Born near Quaker Street, a hamlet in Duanesburg, New York, he moved with his parents to Milford, Otsego County, N.Y.; attended the common schools; engaged in the lumbering trade, hop business, and agricultural pursuits; member of the board of supervisors of Otsego County in 1858, 1859, 1862, 1865, and 1866; director of the Albany and Susquehanna Railroad; director of the Second National Bank of Cooperstown, N.Y.; president of the Wilber National Bank of Oneonta 1874 - 1890.

Personal life 
David Wilber was married on January 1, 1845, to Margaret Belinda Jones. They had two sons, David F. Wilber and George I. Wilber.

Political career 
David Wilber was elected as a Republican to the Forty-third Congress, where he served from March 4, 1873, to March 3, 1875. He was not a candidate for renomination in 1874, however, Wilber was elected to the Forty-sixth Congress (March 4, 1879 - March 3, 1881). Yet again, he was not a candidate for renomination in 1880. He served as a delegate to the Republican National Conventions in 1880 and 1888 while moving to Oneonta, New York in 1886. He then ran again and soon was elected as a Republican to the Fiftieth Congress. This time he was a candidate for renomination and was reelected to the Fifty-first Congress, but owing to ill health took the oath of office at his home and never attended a session. This caused him to only serve from March 4, 1887, up until his death.

Death 
He died on April 1, 1890, in Oneonta, New York and was buried there in Glenwood Cemetery.

See also
List of United States Congress members who died in office (1790–1899)

References

External links
 

1820 births
1890 deaths
Republican Party members of the United States House of Representatives from New York (state)
People from Milford, New York
19th-century American politicians